Bhurgri is a Baloch tribe which lives in various provinces of Pakistan.

History – Origin

The tribe itself is of Baloch origin, having come into Sindh in the late 17th century from the Sulaiman Ranges. The tribe has played a very important role since the start of the Baloch Talpur dynasty's reign, having held important roles in their governance and later on partaking in the wars against the British. The Battle of Meanee and Dubbo are these wars.

Important Settlements 
 Ghulam Nabi Bhurgri, Shadadkot, Sindh. A historic settlement of the tribe. The settlement is right on the border between Balochistan and Sindh.
 Kot Ghulam Muhammad Bhurgri. A very important settlement of the tribe. The majority of the tribe lives in the city or the areas and villages adjacent. The tribe has held the power in these areas since the reign of the talpur, and to this day holds most of the agricultural land. The Palace of Raees Ghulam Muhammad Bhurgri is also situated in this area.
 District Dadu also has a major presence of the tribe.

Notable people
 Raees Ghulam Muhammad Khan Bhurgri (Barrister),(1878–1924) One of the Pioneers of Freedom Movement of PAKISTAN.
 Abdul-Majid Bhurgri, First person to develop Sindhi Computing Solution.
 Abdul Ghafoor Bhurgri,(1 Jan 1921 – 10 Feb 2015) Former Provincial Revenue & Culture Minister Sindh, EX- MPA, Writer, Senior Lawyer, Father of Hero of Sindhi Computing (Abdul Majid Bhurgri).
 Raees Ghulam Mustafa Khan Bhurgri, Politician & former MPA Sindh Assembly
 Raees Khair Mohammad Khan Bhurgri, (Died on 6 June 2013) EX- MPA, Renowned landlord in Sindh.
 Nabi Bux Khan Bhurgari  Member Provincial Assembly of Sindh from 1972 to 1977
Raees Noor Ahmed Bhurgri, Pakistan Peoples Party MPA from PS PS-49 Mirpurkhas-III, Sindh Assembly.
 Raees Jameel Ahmed Bhurgri (21 February 1952 – 21 September 2015) Former MPA Sindh Assembly
 Zahid Ali Bhurgri, EX- MPA, Sindh & Former Provincial Minister for Fisheries.
Lieutenant Colonel Shahida Akram Bhurgri, of the Pakistan Army Medical Corps is also known to be the First Ever Lady Doctor from Sindh to get commissioned in Pakistan Army. Prior to her, there were no Sindhi Female Doctors in Pakistan Army.
  Raees Akhtar Inayat Bhurgri, Secretary Sports and Youth Department Special Secretary Sindh Education Department, Former Secretary, Mining and Mineral Department Sindh, Former Additional Secretary Health Department Sindh, former secretary Sindh Public Service Commission, former secretary Sindhi Language Authority. 
 Dr. Afsana Bhurgri (1 April 1963 – 15 May 2019), Social and Political activist who was active in Sindh, and former vice-president of the Sindh Doctors Association UK.
 Abdul Hamid Bhurgri, Additional Advocate General Sindh High Court,
 Shahana Bhurgri, A social activist and the president of the Sindh Sartiyoon, an Ngo based in Sindh, Pakistan which works for upliftment of the people. She also runs a charitable school through the Sindh education foundation.

Gallery

See also

Kot Ghulam Muhammad
Bhurgari railway station
Rais
Abdul Majid Bhurgri Institute of Language Engineering

 Bhurgri Road, Parsi Colony Saddar Karachi, Near Muhammad Ali Jinnah Road Karachi, Karachi City, Sindh

References

External links
 Bhurgri Website 

Social groups of Pakistan
Sindhi tribes
Baloch tribes
Balochi-language surnames
Pakistani names